Flora Azcuénaga (1767-1850) was an Argentinian philanthropist. In 1823, she was one of the founders of the famous philanthropic society Sociedad de Beneficencia.

References
 Cutolo, Vicente Osvaldo (1968). Nuevo diccionario biográfico argentino (1750-1930). Buenos Aires: Editorial Elche.

1850 deaths
19th-century Argentine people
Argentine philanthropists
1767 births
18th-century Argentine people
18th-century Argentine women
19th-century Argentine women